Marguerite Marie Broquedis (married names Billout-Bordes; 17 April 1893 – 23 April 1983) was a French tennis player.

Biography 
Broquedis was born on 17 April 1893 in Pau, Pyrénées-Atlantiques. She moved with her family to Paris around the turn of the century and started playing tennis on two dusty courts that were part of the Galerie des machines. Later she joined the Racing Club de France.

Broquedis competed at the 1912 Olympics at Stockholm where she won the gold medal in outdoor singles by beating German Dora Köring 4–6, 6–3, 6–4 in the final. In mixed doubles, she won the bronze medal partnering Albert Canet. In 1913 and 1914, she won the French championships, beating 15-year-old Suzanne Lenglen in the 1914 final. Broquedis, nicknamed "the goddess", is also known for being the only player to ever beat Lenglen in a fully played singles final. She also took part in the 1924 Olympics at Paris but could not win any medal there.

She won the singles title at the French Covered Court Championships on six occasions (1910, 1912–13, 1922, 1925, and 1927).

From 1925 to 1927, Broquedis had another successful time in her tennis career, reaching the singles semifinals at Wimbledon in 1925, and the quarterfinals twice at the (now fully international) French championships in 1925 and 1927. Moreover, she won the mixed doubles title partnering Jean Borotra at Paris in 1927. She was ranked world No. 9 by A. Wallis Myers in 1925.

Broquedis died in Orléans in 1983, aged 90.

Major finals

Grand Slam finals

Mixed doubles (1 title, 1 runner-up)

World Hard Court Championships

Singles (1 title, 1 runner-up)

References

External links
 
 

1893 births
1983 deaths
French Championships (tennis) champions
French female tennis players
Olympic bronze medalists for France
Olympic gold medalists for France
Olympic tennis players of France
Sportspeople from Pau, Pyrénées-Atlantiques
Tennis players at the 1912 Summer Olympics
Tennis players at the 1924 Summer Olympics
Olympic medalists in tennis
Medalists at the 1912 Summer Olympics
Grand Slam (tennis) champions in mixed doubles
20th-century French women